Shoi Matsuda (born 13 September 1999) is a Japanese professional road and track cyclist, who currently rides for UCI Continental team . At the 2022 UCI Track Cycling World Championships, he set the Asian record in the individual pursuit in a time of 4:10.521.

Major results

Road

2016
 1st  Road race, National Junior Road Championships
2017
 1st  Time trial, National Junior Road Championships
 7th Overall Tour de DMZ
1st Stage 1
2018
 Asian Road Championships
1st  Team time trial
3rd  Under-23 Time trial
 1st Stage 3 Vuelta a Cantabria
 2nd Road race, National Under-23 Road Championships
 2nd Oita Urban Classic
2019
 6th Time trial, Asian Under-23 Road Championships
 7th Overall Tour de l'Espoir
2021
 1st  Time trial, National Under-23 Road Championships
2022
 2nd Overall Tour de Kumano
 3rd Overall Tour de Hokkaido

Track
2022
 Asian Track Championships
1st  Individual pursuit
1st  Team pursuit

References

External links

1999 births
Living people
Japanese track cyclists
Japanese male cyclists
People from Gifu
Sportspeople from Gifu Prefecture
21st-century Japanese people